Yannick Leonard (born 12 May 1991) is a Guyanese cricketer. He played in eight first-class and two List A matches for the Leeward Islands from 2013 to 2019.

See also
 List of Leeward Islands first-class cricketers

References

External links
 

1991 births
Living people
Guyanese cricketers
Leeward Islands cricketers